Criminal Justice Policy Review is a quarterly peer-reviewed academic journal that covers the field of criminal justice. The editor-in-chief is David L. Myers (Indiana University of Pennsylvania). It was established in 1986 and is currently published by SAGE Publications.

Abstracting and indexing 
Criminal Justice Policy Review is abstracted and indexed in:
 Academic Search Premier
 Academic Search Elite
 Criminal Justice Abstracts
 Family Index Database
 NISC
 Sociological Abstracts

External links 
 

SAGE Publishing academic journals
English-language journals
Criminology journals
Publications established in 1986
Quarterly journals